Ołdaki may refer to the following places:
Ołdaki, Ostrołęka County in Masovian Voivodeship (east-central Poland)
Ołdaki, Pułtusk County in Masovian Voivodeship (east-central Poland)
Ołdaki, Podlaskie Voivodeship (north-east Poland)